Lionel "LJ" Cryer Jr. (born October 9, 2001) is an American college basketball player for the Baylor Bears of the Big 12 Conference.

High school career
Cryer played basketball for Morton Ranch High School in Katy, Texas. As a junior, he averaged 27.5 points, 5.8 assists and 2.9 rebounds per game, earning District 19-6A MVP honors. In the regular season finale of his senior season, Cryer had a 50-point, 10-assist game against Mayde Creek High School. In his senior season, Cryer averaged 34.2 points, 5.3 assists, 2.6 rebounds and 2.4 steals per game. He finished with 3,488 career points, the most in Houston area public school history. Cryer was selected as All-Greater Houston Player of the Year by the Houston Chronicle, and repeated as District 19-6A MVP. A four-star recruit, he committed to playing college basketball for Baylor over offers from Houston, Colorado, LSU, Purdue and Stephen F. Austin, among others.

College career
Cryer received limited playing time as a freshman at Baylor, averaging 3.4 points per game as his team won the national championship. On November 20, 2021, he scored 21 points in a 86–48 victory against Stanford. On January 29, 2022, Cryer was ruled out after aggravating a right foot injury. He averaged 13.5 points, 1.7 assists and 1.5 rebounds per game. As a junior, Cryer was named to the Third Team All-Big 12.

Career statistics

College

|-
| style="text-align:left;"| 2020–21
| style="text-align:left;"| Baylor
| 20 || 0 || 10.0 || .382 || .364 || .643 || .6 || .8 || .5 || .0 || 3.4

Personal life
Cryer's father, Lionel Sr., played college football as a linebacker for Grambling State. His younger brother, Justin, plays the same position at Royal High School in Brookshire, Texas, where his father serves as defensive coordinator.

References

External links
Baylor Bears bio

2001 births
Living people
American men's basketball players
Basketball players from Texas
Baylor Bears men's basketball players
People from Katy, Texas
Point guards